This is a list of feature films produced or distributed by the British company Butcher's Film Service. The company began active production during the First World War. In the 1950s and 1960s, it was a producer of low-budget films, often second features.

1910s

1920s

1930s

1940s

1950s

1960s

See also
 List of Two Cities Films
 List of British and Dominions films
 List of Gainsborough Pictures films
 List of Ealing Studios films
 List of British Lion films
 List of British National films
 List of General Film Distributors films
 List of Stoll Pictures films

References

Bibliography
 Steve Chibnall & Brian McFarlane The British 'B' Film. Bloomsbury Publishing, 2017.

Butcher's Film Service films
Butcher's Film Service